Alterococcus agarolyticus is a Gram-negative, facultatively anaerobic, halophilic and thermophilic bacterium from the genus of Alterococcus.

References

Verrucomicrobiota
Bacteria described in 1999